Francisco Herrera (1576–1656) was a distinguished Spanish painter, born in Seville. He was the founder of the Seville school.

Biography 
Francisco Herrera was born in Seville in 1576. Francisco Pacheco was his teacher, but Herrera soon broke away from the timid style and Italian traditions of Spanish painting of his day, and became the pioneer of that bold, vigorous, effective, and natural style whose preeminent exponent was Velázquez. Herrera was the first to use long brushes, which may, in part, account for his "modern" technique and dexterous brushwork. Many authorities ascribe to him the foundation of the Spanish School. His great talent brought him many pupils, whom his passionate temper and rough manners soon drove away. Velázquez, when thirteen years old, was placed under this great professor, and remained a year with him. Herrera, who was an accomplished worker in bronze, engraved medals skilfully. This gave rise to the charge of counterfeiting, and he fled for sanctuary to the Jesuit College, for which he painted "The Triumph of St. Hermengild", a picture so impressive that when Philip IV saw it (1621) he immediately pardoned the painter. Herrera thereupon returned to Seville. His ungoverned temper soon drove his son to Rome and his daughter to a nunnery. Herrera's pictures are full of energy, the drawing is good and the colouring so cleverly managed that the figures stand out in splendid relief. Many of his small easel pictures, in oil, represent fairs, dances, interiors of inns, and deal with the intimate life of Spain. His large works are nearly all religious. In Seville he painted a "St. Peter" for the cathedral and a "Last Judgment" for the Church of San Bernardo, the latter being considered his masterpiece. After executing many commissions in his native town he removed to Madrid (1650), where he won great renown. In the archiepiscopal palace are four large canvases, one of which, "Moses Smiting the Rock", is celebrated for its dramatic qualities and daring technique. In the cloister of the Merced Calzada is a noteworthy series of paintings whose subjects are drawn from the life of St. Ramon. He painted much in fresco, in which medium his best effort is believed to have been on the vault of San Bonaventura, but this, with all his other frescoes, has disappeared. None of his architectural productions are mentioned, and there remain but a few of his etchings, all of which were reproductions of his paintings. One of his pictures, "St. Basil dictating his doctrine", is in the Louvre, and another, "St. Matthew", is in the Dresden Gallery. Herrera left two sons, "el Rubio" (the ruddy) who died before he fulfilled the great promise of his youth, and "el Mozo" (the younger). He was also the godfather of the Spanish-born Portuguese painter Josefa de Óbidos.

Works
Herrera's finest paintings include "The Last Judgment" and a "Holy Family," both in churches at Seville. Others are in the Louvre, Paris. They exhibit boldness of execution with faultless technique. He is known as El viejo, "the elder," to distinguish him from his son Francisco Herrera the Younger, also a noted painter. Among his pupils was Ignacio de Iriarte and a young Diego Velázquez. Among his other works are:
San Diego (Saint James) (1637), Madrid, private collection
Bebedor (1626), Worcester Art Museum
Job (1636), 215 x 151 cm., Musée des Beaux-Arts de Rouen.
La Parentela de Jesús, Museum of Fine Arts in Bilbao
San Basilio dictando su doctrina (1639), 243 x 194 cm, Louvre
Milagro del Pan y de los Peces (1647), Archbishop's Palace, Madrid
Ciego tocando la zampoña (1650), Kunsthistorische Museum, Vienna

References

External links 

Biographie of Francisco Herrera the Elder at the Web Gallery of Art
Francisco Herrera the Elder on Artcyclopedia
Scholarly articles in English about Francisco de Herrera, the Elder both in web and PDF @ the Spanish Old Masters Gallery

1576 births
1656 deaths
16th-century Spanish painters
Spanish male painters
17th-century Spanish painters
Spanish Baroque painters
Painters from Seville
Catholic painters